The Spain women's national field hockey team represents Spain in the international field hockey competitions.
The team won the gold medal at the 1992 Summer Olympics at their first ever Olympic appearance in front of their home crowd in Terrassa, coached at the time by José Manuel Brasa.

Tournament records

Team

Current squad
The squad for the 2022 Women's FIH Hockey World Cup.

Head coach: Adrian Lock

Notable players

 María Carmen Barea
 Sonia Barrio
 Núria Camón
 Mercedes Coghen
 Gloria Comerma
 Celia Corres
 Natalia Dorado
 Nagore Gabellanes
 Marívi González
 Raquel Huertas
 Anna Maiques
 Silvia Manrique
 Elisabeth Maragall
 María Isabel Martínez
 Teresa Motos
 Silvia Muñoz
 Nuria Olivé
 Virginia Ramírez
 María Ángeles Rodríguez
 María Romagosa
 Maider Tellería
 Maria Jesus Rosa

See also
Spain men's national field hockey team
Spain women's national under-21 field hockey team

References

External links

FIH profile

Field hockey
European women's national field hockey teams
National team